The 2023 Australian Swimming Trials are scheduled to be held from 13 to 18 June 2023 at the Melbourne Sports and Aquatic Centre in Melbourne, Victoria to determine Australia's swimming team for the 2023 World Aquatics Championships in Fukuoka, Japan.

Swimming Australia will select a 56-person team, with a maximum of 28 male athletes and 28 females athletes. The first and second placed swimmers in the open final of any individual Olympic event will be selected provided they meet qualification times set out by Swimming Australia.

Schedule

M = Morning session, E = Evening session

Medal winners
The medallist for the open events are below.

Men

Men multi-class

Women

Women multi-class

References

Swimming
2023 in swimming
Australian Swimming Championships
Sports competitions in Melbourne
June 2023 sports events in Australia